Bohai International Trust Co., Ltd. (BITC) known as just Bohai Trust, is a Chinese investment management company based in Shijiazhuang, Hebei Province. The company has licensed to create trust (as private equity fund). The company is a subsidiary of HNA Group for 51.23% shares (via HNA Capital), plus additional 22.10% shares via China Xinhua Airlines, a subsidiary (83.39%) of Hainan Airlines. Hainan Airlines, a listed company, is partially owned by HNA Group. The remain 26.67% shares of the trust company were owned by another subsidiary of HNA Group, which the group owned 72.98% stake of that subsidiary directly and indirectly (via ).

History
The predecessor of the trust company was founded in December 1983 as Hebei International Trust Investment Corporation. In 2004 the company was re-registered as Hebei International Trust & Investment Co., Ltd., which Hebei Provincial State-owned Assets Supervision and Administration Commission was the largest shareholder for 95.24% stake. The company also changed from "company limited by quote/stake" to "company limited by shares" (analog to public limited company) in 2015.

China Xinhua Airlines did not subscribed the 2016 capital increase of the trust company, making the shares were diluted to 22.10%.

In November 2017, Bohai Trust was sued for failing to pay the collective funds trust plan for the Bohai Trust Ningbo Weitong Investment Project, which was originally scheduled to expire on July 27, 2017.

References

External links
  

Financial services companies of China
Private equity firms of China
Civilian-run enterprises of China
Former government-owned companies of China
Chinese companies established in 1983
Companies based in Hebei
Companies based in Shijiazhuang
HNA Group